The Speaker is the presiding officer of the National Assembly.

List of speakers

List of Deputy Speakers 

 Esther Mcheka Chilenje

References
 Official website of the National Assembly of Malawi

Politics of Malawi
Malawi